Hugh "Hughie" Adcock (born 10 April 1903 in Coalville, England – 16 October 1975) was an English footballer.

Career

Club
Adcock played for Ravenstone United, Coalville Town, Loughborough Corinthians, Bristol Rovers, Folkestone and Ibstock Penistone Rovers and most famously Leicester City.

He made his debut for Leicester on the same day as club record goalscorer Arthur Chandler and was a key player in the emergence of the Midlands' club under Peter Hodge in the mid-1920s and later the side which finished in the club's highest ever league finish of runners-up in the First Division in 1928-29. He made 440 appearances for the club over 13 years making him the club's joint 3rd record appearance holder.

International

He made five appearances and scored one goal for England.

Honours

As a player
Leicester City
Football League First Division Runner-up: 1928-29
Football League Second Division Champion: 1924-25

England
British Home Championship Winner: 1930

Notes

1903 births
People from Coalville
Footballers from Leicestershire
1975 deaths
English footballers
England international footballers
Coalville Town F.C. players
Leicester City F.C. players
Bristol Rovers F.C. players
English Football League players
Association football wingers
English Football League representative players
Folkestone F.C. players
Ibstock United F.C. players
Loughborough Corinthians F.C. players